Duilio Coletti (28 December 1906 – 22 May 1999) was an Italian film director and screenwriter. He directed 29 films between 1934 and 1977.

Career
Born in Penne, Abruzzo, he took a degree in medicine and surgery and practiced the profession for a short time. He entered the film industry as a screenwriter and assistant director in early 1930s, then made his directorial debut in 1935 with Pierpin. Coletti specialized in films of great spectacular impact and was particularly appreciated in the direction of action movies.

His film Submarine Attack was entered into the 4th Berlin International Film Festival. He was a member of the jury at the 8th Berlin International Film Festival.

Selected filmography

 The Fornaretto of Venice (1939)
 Captain Fracasse (1940)
 The Mask of Cesare Borgia (1941)
 The Adulteress (1946)
 Bullet for Stefano (1947)
 Heart (Cuore) (1948)
 The Earth Cries Out (Il grido della terra) (1948) 
 The Wolf of the Sila (1949)
 Romanzo d'amore (1950)
 Free Escape (1951)
 Wanda la peccatrice (1952)
 The Piano Tuner Has Arrived (1952)
 Hell Raiders of the Deep (I sette dell'orsa maggiore), a.k.a. Human Torpedoes (1952)
 Submarine Attack (1954)
 Folgore Division (Divisione Folgore) (1954)
 Bella non piangere! (1955)
 The House of Intrigue (Londra chiama Polo Nord), a.k.a. London Calling North Pole (1956)
 The Italians They Are Crazy (Gli italiani sono matti) (1958)
 Under Ten Flags (1960)
 Black City (Il re di Poggioreale) (1961)
 Anzio (1968)

References

External links

1906 births
1999 deaths
Italian film directors
20th-century Italian screenwriters
Italian film producers
Italian male screenwriters
20th-century Italian male writers